Thomas Gaal, a painter of portraits, birds, and flowers, was born at Dendermonde in 1739. He fixed his residence at Middelburg, and was one of the founders and directors of the Academy in that town. J. Perkois, J. H. Koekkoek, and S. De Koster were his pupils. He died at Middelburg in 1817. The painter Pieter Gaal was his son.

Notes
 

1739 births
1817 deaths
18th-century Flemish painters
18th-century Dutch painters
18th-century Dutch male artists
Dutch male painters
People from Dendermonde